Aleksander Prass (7 February 1891 Kohila Parish, Kreis Harrien – 17 October 1932 Tallinn) was an Estonian politician. He was a member of I Riigikogu. He was a member of the Riigikogu since 15 November 1921. He replaced Jüri Reinthal.

References

1891 births
1932 deaths
People from Kohila Parish
People from Kreis Harrien
Central Committee of Tallinn Trade Unions politicians
Members of the Riigikogu, 1920–1923